Miklós Szabó (born 21 December 1955) is an Australian judoka. He competed in the men's heavyweight event at the 1996 Summer Olympics.

References

External links
 

1955 births
Living people
Australian male judoka
Australian people of Hungarian descent
Olympic judoka of Australia
Judoka at the 1996 Summer Olympics
Sportspeople from Szeged